Malaysia Rugby League Division 1 is the second tier of rugby union league in Malaysia.

Formerly known as National Inter Club Championship (NICC), the league included various clubs from entire Malaysia, mostly the champions from the state league. The Malaysian Rugby Union (MRU) is the organizer of the league.

In 2017, the Super League and National Inter Club Championship (NICC) will be replaced with a more structured and more organized league system, an effort by Malaysia Rugby to be a professional sport in 2018. It also will attract more publicity and coverage by sponsors and local media to promote this sport to local citizens. The Super League will be renamed as Malaysia Rugby League Premier, and two new leagues were introduced to replace NICC, the Malaysia Rugby League Division 1 and Malaysia Rugby League Division 2.

Teams

These teams will be playing in the Malaysia Rugby League Division 1 2017 season.

  KL Saracens
  Kota Bharu RC
  IIUM Mustangs
  SAHOCA RC
  Silver Gaurus RC
  ATM Blackhawks
  Iskandar Troopers
  KL Tigers
  UTM Pirates
  Edwardian Tiger
  Beringin Rendang RC
  JLJ Diraja

Champions

See also

 Malaysia Rugby League Premier
 MRU Super Cup
 Malaysia Rugby League Division 2

External links
 Malaysian Rugby Union's website

    
Rugby union leagues in Malaysia